The Milltown Bridge is a historic stone arch bridge in rural southeastern Sebastian County, Arkansas. The bridge carries County Road 77 across an unnamed brook just west of its junction with White Mountain Road. The arches are formed out of rough-cut stone voussoirs. It was built in the 1930s with funding from the Works Progress Administration, and was, when listed on the National Register of Historic Places in 1990, one of only eight documented bridges of its type in the state.

See also
List of bridges documented by the Historic American Engineering Record in Arkansas
List of bridges on the National Register of Historic Places in Arkansas
National Register of Historic Places listings in Sebastian County, Arkansas

References

External links

Road bridges on the National Register of Historic Places in Arkansas
Historic American Engineering Record in Arkansas
National Register of Historic Places in Sebastian County, Arkansas
Stone arch bridges in the United States
Works Progress Administration in Arkansas
Transportation in Sebastian County, Arkansas